The 16th Annual Gotham Independent Film Awards, presented by the Independent Filmmaker Project, were held on November 29, 2006 and were hosted by David Cross. The nominees were announced on October 23, 2006.

Winners and nominees

Gotham Tributes
 Alfonso Cuarón, Guillermo del Toro and Alejandro González Iñárritu
 Mark Cuban and Todd Wagner
 Edward Norton
 Tim Robbins
 Kate Winslet

References

External links
 

2006
2006 film awards